Adair Ford Boroughs (born 1979/1980) is an American lawyer who serves as the United States attorney for the District of South Carolina.

Education

Boroughs received a Bachelor of Science, summa cum laude, from Furman University in 2002 and a Juris Doctor from Stanford Law School in 2007.

Career 

Boroughs served as a trial attorney in the United States Department of Justice Tax Division from 2007 to 2013. She then served as a law clerk for Judge Richard Gergel of the United States District Court for the District of South Carolina from 2013 to 2017.  From 2017 to 2019, she was the executive director of Charleston Legal Access. She is the founding partner of Boroughs Bryant, LLC where she practiced from 2021 until her confirmation as U.S. attorney in 2022.

U.S. attorney for the District of South Carolina 

On June 6, 2022, President Joe Biden nominated Boroughs to be the United States attorney for the District of South Carolina. On July 14, 2022, her nomination was favorably reported out of committee by voice vote, senators Josh Hawley and Marsha Blackburn were recorded as "no" votes. On July 21, 2022, her nomination was confirmed in the United States Senate by voice vote. She was sworn into office on July 26, 2022.

References

Living people
Year of birth missing (living people)
Place of birth missing (living people)
21st-century American women lawyers
21st-century American lawyers
Furman University alumni
South Carolina lawyers
Stanford Law School alumni
United States Attorneys for the District of South Carolina
United States Department of Justice lawyers